Chelsea Harris (born March 30, 1990) is an American actress best known for roles on Just Jordan, Designated Survivor and Snowpiercer. Currently, she stars on The Neighborhood as Necie.Career
Chelsea Harris had a recurring appearance as Tricia Sims on Designated Survivor. She was later cast in Star Trek: Picard, which was a new step for her. "I have to be super honest... growing up, Star Trek was on TV, but I never really got into it when I was younger. I was watching Disney Channel." Getting cast in the series opened her taste for the Sci-Fi genre and she was cast in a recurring role for season two of Snowpiercer''.

Filmography

References

External links

Living people
1990 births
Actresses from Georgia (U.S. state)
African-American actresses
21st-century African-American people